The discography of American country music singer and songwriter Brett Young consists of seven studio albums, six EPs, as well as singles and music videos. He had his first success with Brett Young released in 2017, which produced a number of hit singles, most notably "In Case You Didn't Know" and "Mercy".

Studio albums

Extended plays

Singles

As lead artist

As featured artist

Other charted songs

Music videos

References

Country music discographies
Discographies of American artists